Datuk Seri Panglima Mohd Shafie bin Apdal (Jawi: محمد ساڤي بن أفضل; born 20 October 1956) is a Malaysian politician who has served as the Member of Parliament (MP) for Semporna since April 1995, State Leader of the Opposition of Sabah since September 2020 and Member of the Sabah State Legislative Assembly (MLA) for Senallang since May 2018. He served as the 15th Chief Minister and the State Minister of Finance of Sabah from May 2018 to September 2020, Minister of Rural and Regional Development from April 2009 to July 2015 and Vice-President of the United Malays National Organisation (UMNO), a component party of the ruling Barisan Nasional (BN) coalition. He has served as the 1st and founding President of Heritage Party (WARISAN) since October 2016. He lost the power as Chief Minister of Sabah following the defeat of his coalition WARISAN + in the 2020 state election.

Early life and education 

Mohd. Shafie bin Apdal was born in 1956 in Semporna, Sabah, Malaysia into a Bajau family. He is the nephew of Sakaran Dandai, who was the eighth Chief Minister of Sabah and its former governor as well.

Shafie completed his secondary education in Victoria Institution, Kuala Lumpur (but attended Sabah College, Kota Kinabalu for his middle school). He has a Diploma in Shipping Management from the London Business College (not to be confused with the London Business School). In 1992, he received his Bachelor in Economics (Hons) from North Staffordshire Polytechnic, England.

Political career 
Shafie started his political career with the United Sabah National Organisation (USNO). The party dissolved in 1994, and Shafie joined UMNO, which was then only starting to gain a presence in the state. In 1995 he was elected to federal Parliament as an UMNO member, for the seat of Semporna. He was appointed a parliamentary secretary before becoming Deputy Minister of Housing and Local Government in 1999. From 1999 to 2004, he was Deputy Minister for Defence.

After the 2004 election, he was appointed Minister of Domestic, Trade and Consumer Affairs in Prime Minister Abdullah Ahmad Badawi's Cabinet and was later given the Ministry of Unity, Culture, Arts and Heritage. On 10 April 2009, he became the Minister of Rural and Regional Development in the first Cabinet of Prime Minister Najib Razak. This coincided with his election to one of the party's three vice-presidential posts, polling in third place behind Ahmad Zahid Hamidi and Hishammuddin Hussein. He was re-elected as an UMNO vice-president in 2013, this time polling in second place, behind Ahmad Zahid and ahead of Hishammuddin. He is the first Sabahan to hold a vice-presidency of UMNO.

On 28 July 2015, Shafie was removed in the Cabinet reshuffle by Najib thus losing his rural and regional development portfolio. Following this, he formed a new Sabah-based opposition party known as WARISAN that was approved by Registrar of Societies (RoS) on 17 October 2016.

Appointment as a Chief Minister 
In the 2018 general election, Shafie's party of WARISAN together with the coalition of Pakatan Harapan (PH) are tied up with 29-29 seats with BN in the 2018 Sabah state election. Jeffrey Kitingan with his party of Homeland Solidarity Party (STAR) under the United Sabah Alliance (USA) which are not aligned from either the two sides, has won two seats in the election and subsequently emerged as the decision maker for the formation of a state government from the two sides. Jeffrey then decide to team up with the BN to form coalition state government with him appointed as a Deputy Chief Minister after Shafie Apdal the president of WARISAN disagreed to Jeffrey's permission to make Sabah's IC and solving the Illegal Immigrant issues in Sabah. Jeffrey Kitingan became the Deputy Chief Minister while Musa Aman from BN to become the Chief Minister for another 5 years under the new coalition government (Coalition of BN-GBS). However, situation change when six seats assemblymen from the BN allied parties of United Pasokmomogun Kadazandusun Murut Organisation (UPKO) and United Sabah People's Party (PBRS) switched their allegiance to WARISAN, giving Shafie an advantage with 35 seats which is sufficient to establish a valid state government. Earlier, Musa Aman had already sworn in as Chief Minister following the help of two seats from STAR. This situation left Sabah with two ruling Chief Ministers, the second in its history since the dispute between PBS and USNO in 1980s. The results of this events sparks a constitutional crisis in Sabah, and the need to review and change the current constitution so as to curb the "allegiance switching" of assemblymen, after the swearing-in ceremony of the chief minister. Another four seats assemblymen from BN allied parties of UMNO and UPKO switching their allegiance to WARISAN on 13 May 2018. The Yang di-Pertua Negeri Juhar Mahiruddin also had requested for Musa to step down, despite Musa still stressing that he still the rightful Chief Minister. Musa was then issued a letter from the TYT that he is no longer the Chief Minister effective from 12 May 2018 that was delivered into his residence on 14 May 2018. On 7 November, the high court in Kota Kinabalu decided that Shafie remained the legitimate Chief Minister of Sabah and dismissed a suit made by Musa who claimed his dismissal as chief minister was illegal and against the state constitution.

On 30 July 2020, upon the political manoeuvring in Sabah, he announced that the Yang di-Pertua Negeri Juhar Mahiruddin had agreed to dissolve the Sabah State Legislative Assembly to hold a state election in his audience with Juhar.

On 27 September 2020, his party lost its majority in the Sabah Election to the Gabungan Rakyat Sabah (GRS) led by Datuk Seri Panglima Hajiji Noor. This makes Datuk Seri Panglima Hajiji Noor as new Chief Minister of Sabah.

Personal life 
He is married to Shuryani Shuaib and has six children.

Election results

Honours
  :
  Companion Class I of the Order of Malacca (DMSM) - Datuk (2002)
  :
 Knight Companion of the Order of Sultan Ahmad Shah of Pahang (DSAP) - Dato' (2003)
  :
  Knight Grand Commander of the Order of the Crown of Perlis (SPMP) - Dato' Seri (2008)
  :
  Commander of the Order of Kinabalu (PGDK) - Datuk (1994)
  Grand Commander of the Order of Kinabalu (SPDK) - Datuk Seri Panglima (2011)
  :
  Knight Commander of the Most Exalted Order of the Star of Sarawak (PNBS) - Dato Sri (2014)

References

External links 

 

Shafie, Apdal
Living people
People from Sabah
Bajau people
Suluk people
Malaysian Muslims
Malaysian political party founders
Former United Malays National Organisation politicians
Sabah Heritage Party politicians
Members of the Dewan Rakyat
Government ministers of Malaysia
Members of the Sabah State Legislative Assembly
Chief Ministers of Sabah
Sabah state ministers
Alumni of Staffordshire University
Knights Commander of the Order of the Star of Hornbill Sarawak
Grand Commanders of the Order of Kinabalu
Commanders of the Order of Kinabalu